The Whangamoa Saddle is a pass traversed by  on its route between Blenheim and Nelson, immediately to the east of Hira. One of the two passes on the route (along with the Rai Saddle to the east), the Whangamoa Saddle lies between the valleys of the Whangamoa and Wakapuaka Rivers south of Delaware Bay. The pass marks part of the boundary between Nelson and Marlborough District.

References

Mountain passes of New Zealand
Landforms of the Nelson Region
Populated places around Tasman Bay / Te Tai-o-Aorere